Jane Welsh (14 January 1905 – 27 November 2001) was a British actress. She portrayed Mrs Brown, William's mother, in the films Just William's Luck (1947) and William Comes to Town (1948).

Selected filmography
 The Sleeping Cardinal (1931) - Kathleen Adair
 The Bells (1931) - Annette
 Frail Women (1932) - The Sister
 Condemned to Death (1932) - Sonia Wallington
 The Missing Rembrandt (1932) - Lady Violet Lamsden
 The Chinese Puzzle (1932) - Victoria
 Whispering Tongues (1934) - Claudia Mayland
 Spring in the Air (1934) - Rosa
 Annie, Leave the Room! (1935) - Lady Mary
 Bell-Bottom George (1944) - Rita
 Just William's Luck (1948) - Mrs. Brown
 William Comes to Town (1948) - Mrs. Brown
 The Second Mate (1950) - Mrs. Mead
 The Dragon of Pendragon Castle (1950) - Mrs. Fielding
 Mantrap (1953) - Laura
 Little Red Monkey (1955) - Supt. McCollum - sanitarium
 Another Time, Another Place (1958) - Jonesh (Last appearance)

References

External links
 
 Obituary from The Independent

1905 births
2001 deaths
English film actresses
Actresses from Bristol